32 Variations on an Original Theme in C minor, WoO 80, is a composition for solo piano by Ludwig van Beethoven, written in 1806.

Analysis
The work consists of an eight-bar main theme and 32 variations. A chord progression in the left hand, based upon a descending chromatic bass, serves as an important structural device. The short and sparse melodic theme, as well as the emphasis on the bass line, reflect a possible influence of the chaconne and the Folia.  The variations have been called "Beethoven’s most overt pianistic homage to the Baroque." The variations differ in character, technical difficulty and dynamics. Pianist Yue Chu points out that the key of C-minor indicates that "Beethoven was serious when composing this work," despite his apparent misgivings later.

Variations

Typically, performances of this piece last from 10 to 12 minutes.

Reception
The piece proved popular, receiving a favorable review in the Allgemeine musikalische Zeitung (Leipzig) in 1807, and remains popular today. Nevertheless, Beethoven did not see fit to assign it an opus number. It is said that later in his life he heard a friend practicing it. After listening for some time he said "Whose is that?" "Yours", was the answer. "Mine? That piece of folly mine?" was his retort; "Oh, Beethoven, what an ass you were in those days!"

See also
Beethoven and C minor

References

External links
 

Piano variations by Ludwig van Beethoven
1806 compositions
Compositions in C minor